Monique Williams may refer to:

Monique Williams (athlete) (born 1985), New Zealand sprinter
Monique Williams (actress) (born 1992), Australian actress